Pierre-Nicolas Sicot, known as Legrand de Lérant or de Sérant (Pont-l'Évêque, 1758 – Bern, 1829), was a French painter.

In 1782, he went to the École nationale supérieure des Beaux-Arts.

Circa 1794, Legrand de Sérant departed for Bern, where he produced a variety of drawings for local notabilities and illustrated a novel by Isabelle de Charrière.

Legrand de Sérant was a member of the Academy of Lille.

Sources 

 Adolphe Siret, Dictionnaire historique et raisonné des peintres de toutes les écoles depuis les temps les plus reculés jusqu’à nos jours, Bruxelles, Périchon, 1844, 1856, p. 442.

1758 births
1829 deaths
18th-century French painters
French male painters
19th-century French painters
19th-century French male artists
18th-century French male artists